Gastone Gambara (10 November 1890 – 27 February 1962) was an Italian General who participated in World War I and World War II. He excelled during the Italian intervention in favor of the nationalists in the Spanish Civil War. During World War II, he had an outstanding role in the North African Campaign and the repression of partisans in Yugoslavia.

Biography 
Born at Imola, Gambara began his military career as a non-commissioned officer before graduating from the Military Academy of Modena. During World War I he served in the Alpini. He was awarded three Silver Medals for Military Valor in 1918. After commanding the 18th Alpini Regiment in the early 1920s he held a variety of staff posts. He was the chief of staff to Bastico during the Second Italo-Ethiopian War.

In November 1938 he was appointed commander of the Corpo Truppe Volontarie, the Italian Corps that fought in the Spanish Civil War. He was commander-in-chief of the Cuerpo de Ejercito Legionario during the Catalonia Offensive, and the final offensive of the Spanish Civil War. On 30 March his troops occupied Alicante. Gambara was Italian ambassador to Spain from 1938 to 1940.

During the Second World War, he fought in France, Yugoslavia, and Libya. He commanded the XV Army Corps during the battle of France (1940) and the VIII Army Corps during the Greco-Italian War (1941). During the Western Desert Campaign Gambara was appointed Chief of Staff of the High Command in North Africa and commanded the Italian XX Army Corps, formed by the 101st Motorized Division "Trieste", along with the 132nd Armored Division "Ariete", which had 137 M13/40 tanks. The Italian XX Corps did not come under Rommel's control until late November 1941. On 24 November 1941, during the Totensonntag Battle, Rommel sent a telegram to Rome asking German military attaché in Italy, General Enno von Rintelen, to persuade Mussolini to place Gambara under his command. Mussolini answered Rommel's requests by anointing him as commander of the Axis troops in Marmarica and placing Italian XX Army Corps at his disposal. Italian units under Gambara's command fought well and bravely. By November 23, the Ariete  with assistance from the Trieste and Savona Divisions, had knocked out about 200 British tanks, and disabled or destroyed a similar number of vehicles. 

On March 3, 1942, Gambara was replaced as Chief of Staff of the High Command in North Africa by lieutenant general Curio Barbasetti di Prun. From December 1942 Gambara commanded the XI Army Corps, which was involved in anti-partisan operations and brutal repression of the population in Slovenia. Fifteen hundred innocent people died In the Rab concentration camp from hunger, privation, and lack of medical care. In the Gonars camp, which included a large number of former Yugoslav soldiers, 420 succumbed to malnutrition and brutal treatment.

Gambara was perfectly aware of the situation, but nevertheless thought it could be an advantage. When the High Commissioner for the Province of Ljubljan Emilio Grazioli turned to him to complain about the harsh treatment meted out to those who had been interned ('absolutely all of them reveal the most severe evidence of lack of activity and starvation'), Gambara harshly answered him: “A concentration camp does not mean a fattening camp; a sick individual is a quiet individual.”

After the Kingdom of Italy joined the Allies, he was appointed chief of staff of the National Republican Army thanks to Rodolfo Graziani’s nomination. In 1945, Gamabra was interned in the Allied POW camp at Coltano. In June 1945 he was dishonorably discharged from the army. In 1947, Gambara emigrated to Spain at Franco's invitation. He returned to Italy in 1952. He died in Rome in 1962.

After the war, the Socialist Federal Republic of Yugoslavia unsuccessfully requested Gambara's extradition, and he along with other suspected Italian war criminals were never tried. The British government frustrated such requests due to their attempt to bolster the anti-communist position of the post-war Italian government. His name appears in the CROWCASS wanted list compiled by the Allies in 1947.

Awards 

 Knight Grand Cross of the Order of the Crown of Italy 
 Silver Medal of Military Valor
 War Merit Cross
 Commemorative Medal for the Italo-Austrian War 1915–1918 
 Commemorative Medal of the Unity of Italy
 Allied Victory Medal
 Commemorative Medal for the Operations in the Italian East Africa, 1936-40
 Knight Grand Cross of the Sovereign Military Order of Malta in August 1939
 Iron Cross First and Second Class

Notes

Sources

External links 

  The Generals of WW II: Gastone Gambara

1890 births
1962 deaths
People from Imola
Alpini
Italian generals
Italian military personnel of World War I
Italian military personnel of World War II
People of the Italian Social Republic
Italian military personnel of the Spanish Civil War